Cherif Mohamed Aly Aidara is a Senegalese-Mauritanian Shia religious leader who is known for his work on international development in West Africa. He is one of the primary Shia religious figures in Senegal and West Africa.

Early life and family
Of mixed Mauritanian and Fulani descent, Cherif Mohamed Aly Aidara was born in 1959 in Darou Hidjiratou, a village in Bonconto Commune, Kolda Region, southern Senegal that was founded by his father. His father is Cherif Al-Hassane Aidara, a Mauritanian man from the Al Lakhal branch of the Laghlal tribe of Mauritania who claims descent from Cherif Moulaye Idriss of the Idrisid dynasty, while his mother is Maimouna Diao, a Senegalese Peul (Fulani) woman from the Diao clan. As a Senegalese sharif, Aidara claims direct descent from the Prophet Muhammad (see silsila).

After completing traditional Islamic education in Senegal, much of which was taught by his father, Aidara continued his education at the Alliance française in Paris, France. He is fluent in Arabic, English, French, Pulaar (Fulfulde), and Wolof.

His brother Cherif Habib Aidara is the leader of Bonconto Commune.

Career
In 2000, Cherif Mohamed Aly Aidara founded the NGO Mozdahir International Institute in Senegal. Aidara has focused on education and development, such as managing social development projects, promoting the use of Islamic microfinance, and increasing awareness of Shi'i Islam in Senegal.

During his early career, Aidara focused his development and educational projects mostly in the Casamance region (Fouladou) of southern Senegal, but has since expanded beyond Senegal into other parts of West Africa, including Mali, Guinea Bissau, Burkina Faso, Ivory Coast, and other African countries. He frequently travels internationally and collaborates with major international NGOs such as the World Food Programme.

He has built and expanded the Mozdahir community across Senegalese cities such as Dakar, Dahra Djoloff, Kolda, Ziguinchor, Saloum, and Vélingara. He also founded the Mozdahir community village of Nadjaf Al Achraf and helped develop Teyel and Foulamori villages, with schools and mosques constructed in each of those villages.

Aidara also directs the radio stations Radio Mozdahir FM in Dakar, and Radio Zahra FM in Kolda (see also list of radio stations in Senegal).

Works
Books in French:

Les Vérités de La Succession du Prophète
Sayyidda Zaynab (pslf) l’héroïne de Karbala
La prière du Prophète Mouhammad (pslf) selon les membres de sa famille
Ghadir Khoum : Qui relate l’évènement de Ghadir et le fameux discours du prophète (pslf) ce jour-là.
Achoura jour de deuil ou jour de fête ?
Principes de la finance islamique

See also

Shia Islam in Senegal
Mozdahir
Darou Hidjiratou

References

1959 births
Senegalese religious leaders
People in international development
Living people